Jerisjärvi is a medium-sized lake of Finland in Muonio and Kittilä. It belongs to Tornionjoki main catchment area in Lapland. in the southern side of the Pallas-Yllästunturi National Park.

See also
List of lakes in Finland

References

Jerisjärvi in the Citizen´s Map site. Retrieved 2014-03-02.

External links
 

Torne river basin
Lakes of Kittilä
Lakes of Muonio